The 1986–87 LSU Tigers basketball team represented Louisiana State University in the Southeastern Conference (SEC) during the 1986-87 NCAA Division I men's basketball season.  The team was coached by Dale Brown and played their home games at LSU Assembly Center in Baton Rouge, Louisiana.

A year after becoming the lowest seeded team (11th) in the NCAA tournament to reach the Final Four, the Tigers nearly reached the Final Four for the second straight season as a double-digit seed. The Tigers finished below .500 during SEC regular season play (8–10, tied for 6th), but played terrific basketball for four consecutive days in an attempt to earn the SEC's automatic bid by nearly winning the SEC tournament. They were beaten by Alabama in the championship game, but it was enough to secure an at-large bid to the NCAA tournament. As the No. 10 seed in the Midwest region, LSU beat No. 7 seed Georgia Tech, No. 2 seed Temple, and No. 3 seed DePaul to reach the Elite Eight – the 4th of Coach Brown’s tenure. In the Midwest regional final, eventual National champion Indiana got by LSU by a single point, 77–76. The Tigers finished with a record of 24–15.

Roster

Schedule and results

|-
!colspan=12 style="background:#33297B; color:#FDD023;"| Regular season

|-
!colspan=12 style="background:#33297B"| SEC tournament

|-
!colspan=12 style="background:#33297B;"| NCAA tournament

References

LSU Tigers basketball seasons
Lsu
Lsu
LSU
LSU